= Giampietro Comolli =

Italian agronomist, wine expert and consultant

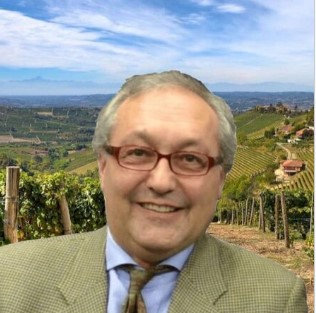
- Giampietro Comolli during a wine conference
- Born: 21 July 1954 (age 72); Piacenza, Italy
- Education: Degree in Agricultural Sciences
- Occupations: Agronomist, consultant, wine expert, journalist
- Years active: 1980s–present
- Title: President, Osservatorio Economico Vini e Spumanti

Giampietro Comolli (born 21 July 1954 in Piacenza, Italy) is an Italian agronomist, consultant and wine sector specialist active in agriculture, viticulture and agro-food policy.

== Education ==
Comolli graduated in Agricultural Sciences and specialised in European agricultural political economy and agro-food marketing.

== Career ==
=== Coldiretti ===
He began his professional career within Coldiretti, serving in leadership roles in the provincial federation of Piacenza and working on economic policy, environmental issues and the wine sector.

=== Wine sector ===
From the 1990s onward Comolli held strategic and consultancy positions in several Italian wine territories and companies, including work connected to Ferrari–Lunelli and activities in the Oltrepò Pavese area.

His work has focused on organisational development, regulatory frameworks and territorial promotion within the Italian wine industry.

== Publications ==
Comolli is a registered publicist journalist and author of books and publications on wine economics and agro-food markets. His works are catalogued in the Italian National Library Service (SBN).
